Several ships have borne the name Martha:

 Martha was a merchant ship flying the British flag when  captured her on 10 March 1778. 
  was built on the Thames River. The British East India Company chartered her for a voyage to Bengal, where she wrecked. 
  was constructed in Sydney, the schooner was a sealer and merchant vessel that wrecked near Sydney,  Australia, in August 1800.
  was launched at Quebec. In 1818 she transported convicts to New South Wales. She remained in the South Pacific as a whaler until she was condemned in 1820 as unseaworthy and then sold for breaking up.

Ship names